Sarah N. Dawson (born January 22, 1975) is an American, former collegiate All-American, softball pitcher and head coach. She played college softball for Louisiana–Monroe and is the Southland Conference career leader in wins, strikeouts, shutouts, WHIP and innings pitched. She ranks top-10 all-time in NCAA Division I for career shutouts (9th) and innings (5th).

After graduating from college, Dawson played three years of professional softball for the Orlando Wahoos/Akron Racers. Dawson served as an assistant softball coach at Marshall and Louisiana–Monroe, before serving as the head softball coach at Louisiana Tech from 2003 to 2012.

Early life
Dawson attended Christian High School San Diego in El Cajon, California, where she played softball for her mother, legendary California high school softball coach Roma Dawson.

Playing career
She played college softball for Louisiana–Monroe team from 1994 to 1997. She is the Southland Conference career leader in wins, strikeouts, shutouts, WHIP and innings pitched and was named Southland Conference Freshman, Player and Pitcher of the Year during her career. She ranks top-10 all-time in NCAA Division I for career shutouts (9th) and innings (5th). After graduating from college, Dawson played three years of professional softball for the Orlando Wahoos/Akron Racers franchise of WPSL.

Coaching career
While head coach at Louisiana Tech, Dawson compiled a record of 221–338, and led the Lady Techsters to a WAC conference championship and a berth in the 2008 NCAA Division I softball tournament.

Statistics

ULM Warhawks

Head coaching record 

* Louisiana Tech vacated 19 wins (including 3 WAC games) in 2009 by NCAA action.

References

External links
 Louisiana Tech bio

1975 births
Living people
Softball players from California
Akron Racers players
American softball coaches
Louisiana–Monroe Warhawks softball players
Louisiana–Monroe Warhawks softball coaches
Marshall Thundering Herd softball coaches
Louisiana Tech Lady Techsters softball coaches
Sportspeople from San Diego